The Ningbo–Jinhua Expressway, commonly referred to as the Yongjin Expressway is a  that connects the cities of Ningbo and Jinhua in the Chinese province of Zhejiang. The expressway is an auxiliary route of G15 Shenyang–Haikou Expressway. This expressway was opened in December 28 2005.

Route
The expressway is entirely in Zhejiang and connects the following cities:
 Ningbo
 Shengzhou
 Jinhua

References

Chinese national-level expressways
Expressways in Zhejiang